Óscar Collazos (born in Bahía Solano, 29 August 1942 – died Bogotá, 17 May 2015) was a Colombian writer, journalist, essayist and literary critic. He wrote 18 novels, 17 collections of short stories and a wide-ranging series of critical works. Among his best-known books are: Rencor (2006), Cartagena en la olla podrida (2001), Desplazados del futuro (2003), Señor sombra (2009), En la laguna más profunda (2011) and Tierra quemada (2013).

References

Colombian journalists
Colombian essayists
Colombian male short story writers
Colombian short story writers
Colombian literary critics
People from Chocó Department
1942 births
2015 deaths
Male journalists
Colombian male novelists
Male essayists
20th-century Colombian novelists
21st-century Colombian novelists
20th-century short story writers
21st-century short story writers
20th-century essayists
21st-century essayists
20th-century male writers
21st-century male writers